"Play the Game Tonight" is a progressive rock single recorded by Kansas for their 1982 album Vinyl Confessions. It managed to chart at No. 17 on the Billboard Hot 100 chart, becoming the 15th single, 10th top 100 hit, sixth top 40 hit, and the third of four Top 20 hits produced by Kansas.

The song was written and produced during the John Elefante period of Kansas and was on the first of two albums to be produced during that period (the other being Drastic Measures). The song has been re-released on several live and compilation albums, including The Best of Kansas, The Ultimate Kansas, Sail On: The 30th Anniversary Collection, and the Device, Voice, Drum live CD/DVD combo.

Structure 
The song begins with a slow, mysterious piano intro played by John Elefante, which continues playing as Elefante comes in on vocals, singing the first verse. As the verse progresses to the end, there is an increase in volume leading up to the chorus, where Elefante is backed by Robby Steinhardt, Dave Hope, Kerry Livgren, and Roger Taylor on vocals. The same structure repeats with the second verse and chorus, leading up to a violin solo by Steinhardt, progressing into the third and final chorus.
On the album Vinyl Confessions, a follow-up to the song, "Play On", is played near the end of the album.

Reception
Cash Box described "Play the Game Tonight" as "a stormy- slice of ornate pop/rock, moving from a quiet 'Dust In The Wind'-type opening to a marching chorus."

Music video
The music video depicts, in between the band playing the song, a chess game played by two hooded beings. One is dressed in white and represents Life and all Mankind's accomplishments (a baby developing in a womb and a Moon landing (Apollo 11 ?) is seen in two clippings), while the other wears black and is meant to represent Death and Destruction (as seen by clips of a military landing (war) and a nuclear explosion). The pieces in the chess set are characters from J.R.R. Tolkien's The Lord of the Rings. At the end of the video, the chess piece that is the rook, on the side of the figure in white, makes a move across the board to the king piece of the figure in black; putting him into either check or checkmate, as the camera zooms out and the black figure pauses, before the video fades out.

Personnel

 Steve Walsh — lead vocals
 Kerry Livgren — keyboards, backing vocals
 Robby Steinhardt — violin, backing vocals
 Rich Williams — electric guitar
 Dave Hope — bass, backing vocals
 Phil Ehart — drums

Guest musicians

 David Pack, Donna Williams — background vocals
 Roger Taylor — background vocals

Chart performance

Weekly charts

Year-end charts

References

Kansas (band) songs
1982 singles
Song recordings produced by Ken Scott
Songs written by Kerry Livgren
1982 songs
Epic Records singles